The de Havilland PS.23 or PS.52 Gyron, originally the Halford H-4, was Frank Halford's last turbojet design while working for de Havilland.

The design proved too powerful for contemporary aircraft designs and saw no production use. It was later scaled down to 45% of its original size to produce the de Havilland Gyron Junior, which was somewhat more successful.

Design and development

The Gyron was Halford's first axial-flow design, a complete departure from his earlier centrifugal-flow engines based on Whittle-like designs, the Goblin (H-1) and Ghost (H-2). The Gyron was also one of the first engines designed specifically for supersonic flight.

The Gyron first ran in 1953. Flight testing started in 1955 on a modified Short Sperrin, a bomber design that was instead turned into an experimental aircraft. The Sperrin used four Rolls-Royce Avons, mounted in over/under pairs in a single pod on each wing. For testing, the lower Avons were replaced with the much larger Gyrons.

The Gyron was selected for a number of projects, most notably the Hawker P.1121 (sometimes referred to as the Hurricane) supersonic attack aircraft that was to have been the replacement for the Hawker Hunter. However, this project was eventually cancelled. Another design potentially based on the Gyron was the Operational Requirement F.155 interceptor, which optionally used the Rolls-Royce RB.106. F.155 was also cancelled, part of the 1957 Defence White Paper. Government financial support of the Gyron project itself was cancelled in March 1957, at a reported total cost of £3.4 million.

Engines on display
An example of the Gyron is held by the Science Museum, London, another is on public display at the de Havilland Aircraft Museum, St Albans.

Specifications (Gyron D.Gy.2)

See also

References

External links

Photo of DH Gyron at DH Heritage Centre

Gyron
1950s turbojet engines